The Little Rock Bowl  is a proposed NCAA Division I Football Bowl Subdivision college football bowl game to be played in Little Rock, Arkansas at War Memorial Stadium. The college conferences that would have tie-ins with the bowl are the American Athletic Conference and the Sun Belt Conference.

History
In 2013, officials of the Mid-American Conference and the Sun Belt Conference first met with officials of the War Memorial Stadium Commission on the possibility of hosting a bowl game at War Memorial Stadium.  The bowl game would be called the Rice Bowl.   In 2015, officials of the American and Sunbelt Conferences were finalizing plans to have the bowl game approved by the NCAA.  On April 11, 2016, the NCAA announced a freeze on new bowl games until after the 2019 season.

References

College football bowls
Annual sporting events in the United States
American football in Arkansas